This is a list of the non-marine mollusks of the Indiana Dunes. Indiana Dunes National Park is a National Park Service unit on the shore of Lake Michigan in the state of Indiana, United States. A BioBlitz took place there on May 15 and 16, 2009. During that time, a list of organisms was compiled which included land and freshwater mollusks. 46 species of snails and slugs (non-marine gastropods) were found, as well as 20 species of freshwater bivalves, freshwater clams and mussels.

List of gastropod species

Freshwater snails in alphabetical order
 Amnicola limosus – a very small freshwater snail with a gill
 Aplexa hypnorum = Aplexa elongata – small sinistral, air-breathing freshwater snail
 Campeloma decisum – pointed campeloma, freshwater snail
 Gyraulus parvus - rams horn snail, freshwater snail
 Helisoma anceps – two-ridge rams horn snail
 Menetus dilatatus – a small rams horn snail
 Physella gyrina – an air breathing sinistral snail
 Planorbella campanulata - a rams horn snail
 Planorbella trivolvus – small aquatic snail
 Planorbula armigera – ramshorn snail
 Pleurocera acuta - hornsnail
 Pomatiopsis lapidaria
 Promenetus exacuous - small rams horn snail
 Stagnicola caperatus – an air-breathing pond snail
 Stagnicola elodes - an air-breathing pond snail
 Valvata perdepressa – freshwater snail with a gill, valve snail

Land snails and slugs in alphabetical order
 Anguispira alternata – flamed tigersnail
 Arion sp. – land slug
 Arion subfuscus – land slug
 Catinella vermeta – land snail
 Cochlicopa lubrica – glossy pillar
 Deroceras laeve – land slug, pest to agriculture
 Euchemotrema sp. – small snail
 Euchemotrema froeteruum
 Fossaria obrussa also known as Lymaea obrussa
 Gastrocopta armifera - armed snaggletooth, land snail
 Gastrocopta contracta - micromollusk, land snail
 Gastrocopta similis - micromollusk, land snail
 Glyphyalinia indentata - micromollusk, land snail
 Haplotrema concavum
 Helicodiscus parallelus – compound coil snail, land snail
 Hoyia sheldoni in the family Hydrobiidae
 Ariophanta laevipes - Laevapex fuscus
 Limax maximus - great gray slug
 Mesodon thyroides (=? Mesodon thyroidus)
 Nesovitrea electrina - land snail
 Novisuccinea ovalis- an ambersnail
 Oxyloma sp. - an ambersnail
 Pallifera fosteri - the foster mantle slug
 Philomycus carolinianus – terrestrial land slug
 Pupoides albilabris – a minute land snail
 Strobilops aeneus - a minute land snail
 Vallonia excentrica – a minute land snail common in Europe
 Vertigo sp. - minute land snail
 Zonitoides arboreus – land snail found in, but not indigenous to the Czech Republic, Great Britain, Slovakia and various greenhouses in other countries
 Zonitoides nitidus – small land snail found mostly in Europe, but also in other countries

List of bivalve species in alphabetical order

 Amblema plicata - the threeridge, a freshwater mussel
 Anodontoides sp. - a freshwater mussel
 Corbicula fluminea - the Asian clam, introduced
 Dreissena polymorpha - the zebra mussel, an invasive introduced species
 Elliptio dilatata - spike mussel or lady finger
 Fusconaia flava - a freshwater mussel
 Lampsilis cardium  - a freshwater mussel
 Lasmigona complanata - the white heelsplitter
 Lasmigona compressa - the creek heelsplitter
 Lasmigona costata - heelsplitter
 Musculium sp. - a freshwater clam
 Pisidium sp. - a pea clam
 Pleurobema sintoxia - the round pigtoe
 Quadrula pustulosa - the  pimpleback
 Quadrula quadrula - the mapleleaf
 Sphaerium occidentale - a fingernail clam
 Sphaerium simile - a fingernail clam
 Strophitus undulatus - a freshwater mussel
 Venustaconcha ellipsiformis - the ellipse, a freshwater mussel
 Villosa iris - the rainbow mussel

References

External links 
 Webpage for the bioblitz 2009

Non-marine mollusks Indiana Dunes
Indiana Dunes
mollusks, non-marine
Indiana Dunes